Air Marshal Hifazat Ullah Khan HI(M), SBt, is former three-star general air officer who served as Vice Chief of the Air Staff (VCAS) of Pakistan Air Force from 29 March 2009 till 4 October 2010.

Education and early life
Hifazat was born in Mianwali. He is a graduate of PAF College Lower Topa where he belonged to V Entry. He then joined the Pakistan Air Force Academy at Risalpur and was commissioned on 25 October 1974 in 58th GD(P) course.  He has qualified  Staff College and Air War Course from PAF Air War College; L'ESGI and CSI from the École Militaire in France. He holds a M.Sc. in Strategic studies, from  Karachi University.

Air Force career

Air Marshal Hifazat got commissioned in 1974 in General Duties (Pilot) Branch of Pakistan Air Force (PAF). A fighter pilot of Mirage III, he has commanded No. 5 Tactical Attack and Reconnaissance Squadron, No. 33 Tactical Attack Wing as Commanding Officer and has served as flying instructor at the Combat Commanders' School. In staff jobs, he has served as director flight safety and deputy project director JF-17 Thunder programme at the air headquarters. He has commanded an operational air base PAF Base Samungli. Thereafter, he was promoted to two-star general rank in Air Force as Air Vice Marshal and served as director general NAB Frontier. In November 2004, he was appointed air officer commanding Northern Air Command of PAF.

Senior staff appointments in PAF

In March 2006, he was appointed Deputy Chief of the Air Staff (Personnel) and in July 2007, he was promoted to the three-star general rank in the Air Force as Air Marshal. On 29 March 2009 Air Marshal Hifazat Ullah Khan was appointed Vice Chief of the Air Staff of Pakistan Air Force.

External appointments

He has also previously served as Air and Naval Attaché at the Pakistan Embassy in Saudi Arabia.

References

Chiefs of Air Staff, Pakistan
Pakistan Air Force air marshals
Living people
1952 births
University of Karachi alumni
People of the insurgency in Khyber Pakhtunkhwa
PAF College Sargodha alumni
Pakistani military attachés